Tigges is a surname. Notable people with the surname include:

Jakob Tigges, German architect and academic 
Leon Tigges (born 1998), German footballer 
Steffen Tigges (born 1998), German footballer, brother of Leon